Clare B Dimyon MBE is a British advocate for LGBT rights. As a Quaker, Dimyon has campaigned for peace and human rights since 1984 when she attended Greenham Common to protest against Cruise missiles aimed at the then Soviet Union and the Soviet-occupied countries of central & eastern Europe.

In 2010 she was awarded the Member of the Order of the British Empire for "services to promoting the rights (the citation missed "& responsibilities" she always advocated) of lesbian, gay, bisexual and transgender people in central and eastern Europe".

In 2016, Dimyon spoke to the press about her experience as a survivor of a violent life-threatening sexual assault in 1984, which occurred at Greenham Common  in support of a 14 year old who was abducted and raped in Oxford.

Dimyon first created a purple banner proclaiming that “everyone knows a Black lesbian, Stormé, started Stonewall.” She first took it to Brighton Pride in London. The banner has since travelled to marches and protests across the United Kingdom and Europe.

References 

Year of birth missing (living people)
Living people
British Quakers
Honorary Members of the Order of the British Empire
British LGBT rights activists